is a Japanese voice actor and narrator from Suginami, Tokyo who is affiliated with Aoni Production. He is the son of voice actor Akio Nojima, and elder brother of voice actor Kenji Nojima.

Filmography

Anime

Video games

Tokusatsu

Dubbing

Discography

Drama CD

References

External links
 Official agency profile 
 

1973 births
Living people
Japanese male voice actors
Japanese male video game actors
People from Suginami
Male voice actors from Tokyo
20th-century Japanese male actors
21st-century Japanese male actors
Aoni Production voice actors
Sigma Seven voice actors